Sir Michael John Anthony Partridge, KCB is a retired British civil servant, who served as Permanent Secretary to the former Department of Social Security.  After his civil service career he was pro-vice chancellor and governor at Middlesex University.

Education

Partridge studied at Merchant Taylors' School and then at St. John's College, Oxford.  He is now an Honorary Fellow of St. John's.

References

Living people
People associated with Middlesex University
British civil servants
Year of birth missing (living people)